

Headline Event of the Year
Baseball's Shot Heard 'Round the World gives the New York Giants the National League Pennant in the third game of a best-of-three-games tiebreaker series over the Brooklyn Dodgers.

Although the Negro American League would last until 1960, 1951 was, notably, the last season in which the Negro American League was considered major-league caliber, which was itself the last major Negro league baseball organization.

Champions

Major League Baseball
World Series: New York Yankees over New York Giants (4–2)
All-Star Game, July 10 at Briggs Stadium: National League, 8–3

Other champions
All-American Girls Professional Baseball League: South Bend Blue Sox
Amateur World Series: Puerto Rico
College World Series: Oklahoma
Japan Series: Yomiuri Giants over Nankai Hawks (4–2)
Little League World Series: Stamford, Connecticut
Pan American Games: Cuba over USA
Winter Leagues
Caribbean Series: Cangrejeros de Santurce
Cuban League: Leones del Habana
Mexican Pacific League: Tacuarineros de Culiacán
Panamanian League: Spur Cola Colonites
Puerto Rican League: Cangrejeros de Santurce
Venezuelan League: Navegantes del Magallanes

Awards and honors
Baseball Hall of Fame
Mel Ott
Jimmie Foxx
MLB Most Valuable Player Award
 Yogi Berra, New York Yankees, C
 Roy Campanella, Brooklyn Dodgers, C
MLB Rookie of the Year Award
Gil McDougald, New York Yankees, 3B
Willie Mays, New York Giants, OF
The Sporting News Player of the Year Award
Stan Musial St. Louis Cardinals
The Sporting News Manager of the Year Award
Leo Durocher New York Giants

Statistical leaders

Major league baseball final standings

American League final standings

National League final standings

Events

January
January 23 – Guido Rugo sells his interest in the Boston Braves to copartners Lou Perini and treasurer Joe Maney.
January 26 – The baseball writers vote Mel Ott and Jimmie Foxx into the Hall Of Fame.

February
February 5 –  California governor Earl Warren rejects the rumor that he is a candidate for the MLB Commissioner position.

March
March 10 – The St. Louis Browns reveal plans to move the club to Milwaukee because of poor attendance.
March 12 – Baseball commissioner Happy Chandler loses his bid to remain in office. Chandler, who started his term as commissioner in 1945, is voted down, 9–7, in a tally of owners. He will be succeeded by Ford C. Frick.
March 21 – During spring training, Pittsburgh Pirates lefty first baseman Dale Long makes his first appearance as a catcher in an exhibition game at San Diego, California, after Pirates general manager Branch Rickey decided to flaunt tradition and try him as a catcher for the foreseeable future. Pretty soon, Long joined the St. Louis Browns on waivers and went back to first base. Eventually, he would catch two games in 1958 with the Chicago Cubs, using a first baseman's mitt.
March 30 – Johnny Vander Meer is released by the Chicago Cubs.

April
April 17 – At Shibe Park, the Philadelphia Athletics and the Washington Senators play the first Opening Day night game in American League history. The Senators prevailed, 6–1, behind the solid pitching of Cuban 40-year-old Connie Marrero, as his batterymate Mickey Grasso hits a three-run home run. Marrero pitches nine strong innings, allowing one earned run on seven hits and two walks while striking out six batters. Bobby Shantz is the losing pitcher.

May
May 1 – On Mother's Day, New York Yankees rookie Mickey Mantle hit the first home run of his career off Randy Gumpert in an 8–3 victory over the Chicago White Sox at Comiskey Park. In the same game, Cuban third baseman and former Negro leagues star Minnie Miñoso becomes the first black player in White Sox franchise history. In his first Major League at-bat, Miñoso hit a home run while facing Yankees starter Vic Raschi.
May 2 – At Briggs Stadium, Philadelphia Athletics pinch hitter Lou Limmer stepped into the batters box to face Detroit Tigers pitcher Saul Rogovin. The 6'2" right-hander peered in to get the signal from catcher Joe Ginsberg, nodded assent, and went into the windup. Around came the arm, in came the pitch and Limmer swung, sending a drive to deep right that cleared the fence for a home run. After all, pinch hit home runs are not unique, but what is unique is that the pitcher, the catcher, and the hitter were all Jewish. It is the only known time in Major League Baseball that has occurred. 
May 6 – In the second game of a doubleheader, Cliff Chambers pitches a no-hitter, as the Pittsburgh Pirates top the Boston Braves, 3–0.
May 28 – After starting his career 0-for-12, New York Giants outfielder Willie Mays gets his first major league hit, a home run off Boston Braves ace Warren Spahn.

June
June 4 – Gus Bell hits for the cycle, droves in three runs and scores two more, to lead the Pittsburgh Pirates to a 12–4 victory over the Philadelphia Phillies at Connie Mack Stadium.

July
July 1 – In the first game of a doubleheader, Bob Feller tosses the third no-hitter of his career for the Cleveland Indians in a 2–1 win over the Detroit Tigers.
July 10 – Exploding for a record four home runs, the National League trounces the American League, 8–3, at the annual All-Star Game, at Briggs Stadium in Detroit. Pittsburgh Pirates' slugger Ralph Kiner hits a home run for the 3rd year in a row.
July 12 – New York Yankees hurler Allie Reynolds pitches a no-hitter against the Cleveland Indians in a 1–0 win.
July 17 – After pitching for Bill Veeck in Cleveland in 1948, Satchel Paige rejoins him with the St. Louis Browns.
July 28 – Clyde Vollmer, who started the month on the bench, continues his explosive fireworks against the Indians. Vollmer singles in the tying run in the 15th inning and then in the 16th hits a grand slam off reliever Bob Feller for an 8–4 Red Sox win. The grand slam is the latest hit in a game in major-league history. Mickey McDermott pitches all 16 innings for the Sox, striking out 15 and walking one.

August
August 11 – Robin Roberts of the Philadelphia Phillies beat the New York Giants, 4–0, dropping the Giants 13.5 games behind the first-place Brooklyn Dodgers.
August 19 – Bill Veeck, the showman and maverick owner of the St. Louis Browns, pulls off one of the greatest stunts in baseball history. In the second game of a doubleheader against the Detroit Tigers, Veeck sends Eddie Gaedel to the plate as a pinch-hitter for leadoff batter Frank Saucier. Due to his extremely small strike zone, Gaedel walked on four consecutive pitches and was immediately pulled for a pinch-runner. American League president Will Harridge, saying Veeck was making a mockery of the game, voided Gaedel's contract the next day. Detroit went on to win the game, 6–2.

September
September 1 – New York Giants outfielder Don Mueller hit three home runs and drove in five runs in an 8–1 victory over the Brooklyn Dodgers at Polo Grounds.  Sal Maglie was the winning pitcher. Dodgers starter Ralph Branca‚ coming off two consecutive shutouts‚ lasted only four innings. The only run for Brooklyn came on a hit by pitch, when Maglie hit Jackie Robinson with the bases loaded in the third inning. Besides, Whitey Lockman was plunked twice by Dodgers relievers Bud Podbielan and Phil Haugstad. In a flashy fielding play, shortstop Alvin Dark and second baseman Eddie Stanky combined in the fifth inning on a triple play off a liner by Dodgers shortstop Pee Wee Reese.
September 14 – Bob Nieman of the St. Louis Browns became the first player in Major League history to hit two home runs in his debut. Nieman will be joined by Bert Campaneris (1964) and Mark Quinn (1999) in the select group.
September 28 – Allie Reynolds turns in the second no-hitter of his career, and his second this season, as the New York Yankees blank the Boston Red Sox, 8–0.

October
October 3 – The New York Giants had been thirteen and one-half games behind the National League leading Brooklyn Dodgers in August, but under Leo Durocher's guidance and with the aid of a sixteen-game winning streak, caught the Dodgers to tie for the lead with two days left in the season. As both teams won their last two games, they ended up tied. The two teams play a best-of three playoff. In Game 3 with one out in the ninth inning and runners on second and third, the Giants were down 4–2 to the Dodgers when Bobby Thomson hit a home run to win the game 5–4. The "Shot heard 'round the world" clinched the National League pennant for the Giants, and WMCA-AM radio announcer Russ Hodges' frantic "The Giants win the pennant!", said four times consecutively, is one of the most famous home run calls in baseball history.
October 10 – The New York Yankees defeat the New York Giants, 4–3, in Game 6 of the World Series to win their third consecutive World Championship, and fourteenth overall. Just before the game, Giants manager Leo Durocher turns over a letter he received to Ford Frick that offered the Giants manager a $15,000 bribe "if the Giants managed to lose the next 3 games".
October 17 – The Yomiuri Giants win the Japan Series over the Nankai Hawks. The Giants went on to win the Central League pennant 19 times in the next 23 years, including nine in succession (1965–73).

November
November 1 – Brooklyn Dodgers catcher Roy Campanella was named National League Most Valuable Player, the first of three awards he would receive during his Hall of Fame career. During the season, Campanella hit a .325 batting average with 33 home runs and 108 run batted in.
November 10 – In Tokyo, Japan 50,000 fans are on hand as an American All-Star team battles a Central League All-Star team. Joe DiMaggio hits a 400-foot home run in the eighth inning to tie the game at 1–1, then his younger brother Dom laces an RBI-triple in the ninth and later scores to give the Americans a 3–2 victory. The Americans have won 12 games and tied one.
November 23 – The New York Yankees send young catcher Clint Courtney to the St. Louis Browns in exchange for pitcher Jim McDonald. Courtney, regarded as the first major league catcher to wear eyeglasses, had appeared in one game for New York.
November 27 – In an eight-player trade, the St. Louis Browns send C Sherm Lollar, P Al Widmar and IF Tom Upton to the Chicago White Sox in exchange for C Gus Niarhos, P Dick Littlefield, 1B Gordon Goldsberry, SS Joe DeMaestri and OF Jim Rivera. Rivera, a favorite of Browns manager Rogers Hornsby, will return to the Sox in eight months.
November 28 – The St. Louis Browns trade Niarhos, along with OF Ken Wood to the Boston Red Sox for C Les Moss and OF Tom Wright. The Browns also sign Marty Marion, former St. Louis Cardinals shortstop/manager.

December
December 11 – Three-time MVP and 13-time All Star center fielder Joe DiMaggio officially retired as a member of the New York Yankees. In a 13-season career for the club, DiMaggio posted a .325 batting average with 361 home runs and 1,537 runs batted in in 1,736 games played. A future Hall of Famer, his 56-game consecutive-game hitting streak in the 1941 season is the longest in Major League Baseball history and will stand as one of the all-time best diamond achievements.

Movies
Rhubarb
Angels in the Outfield

Births

January
January 2 – Jim Essian
January 2 – Bill Madlock
January 2 – Royle Stillman
January 5 – Bob Reece
January 6 – Don Gullett
January 6 – Joe Lovitto
January 10 – Gary Martz
January 14 – Derrel Thomas
January 22 – Leon Roberts
January 23 – Charlie Spikes
January 25 – Balor Moore
January 25 – Vern Ruhle
January 27 – Mike Overy
January 29 – Sergio Ferrer

February
February 2 – Leo Foster
February 3 – Mike Wallace
February 4 – Stan Papi
February 7 – Benny Ayala
February 8 – Steve Dillard
February 9 – Eddie Solomon
February 12 – Don Stanhouse
February 14 – Larry Milbourne
February 15 – Tommy Cruz
February 16 – Glenn Abbott
February 17 – Mike Cosgrove
February 17 – Dave Roberts
February 24 – Frank Ortenzio
February 25 – César Cedeño
February 28 – Rufino Linares
February 28 – Tom Spencer
February 28 – Jim Wohlford

March
March 2 – Mike Johnson
March 4 – Sam Perlozzo
March 7 – Jeff Burroughs
March 20 – Terry McDermott
March 27 – Dick Ruthven

April
April 2 – Tom Johnson
April 5 – Rennie Stennett
April 6 – Bert Blyleven
April 7 – Dave Cripe
April 7 – Dave Oliver
April 11 – Sid Monge
April 18 – Doug Flynn
April 21 – Randy Sterling
April 29 – Rick Burleson

May
May 1 – Rudy Meoli
May 6 – Steve Staggs
May 8 – Dennis Leonard
May 9 – Dan Thomas
May 12 – Joe Nolan
May 16 – Mike Potter
May 18 – Eric Gregg
May 18 – Jim Sundberg
May 24 – Dave Machemer

June
June 5 – Randy Elliott
June 5 – Darryl Jones
June 9 – Billy Baldwin
June 9 – Dave Parker
June 12 – Dave Skaggs
June 16 – Stan Wall
June 22 – Mike Anderson
June 24 – Mike Bruhert
June 24 – Ken Reitz
June 29 – Jimmy Freeman
June 29 – Bruce Kimm

July
July 1 – Jim Otten
July 2 – Keith Marshall
July 5 – Goose Gossage
July 8 – Alan Ashby
July 10 – Bob Bailor
July 11 – Ed Ott
July 29 – Dan Driessen
July 29 – Ken Kravec
July 29 – Greg Minton
July 29 – Gary Thomasson

August
August 1 – Pete Mackanin
August 4 – Joe McIntosh
August 5 – Mardie Cornejo
August 7 – Charlie Chant
August 7 – Jim Sadowski
August 9 – Steve Swisher
August 11 – Jim Hughes
August 17 – Butch Hobson
August 19 – Luis Gómez
August 21 – John Stearns
August 22 – John Doherty
August 22 – Ike Hampton
August 27 – Buddy Bell
August 28 – Joel Youngblood

September
September 2 – Dave Criscione
September 3 – Alan Bannister
September 3 – Dave Campbell
September 8 – Steve Barr
September 10 – Randy Wiles
September 13 – Tom McMillan
September 18 – Tony Scott
September 19 – Nardi Contreras
September 27 – Doug Konieczny
September 28 – Dave Rajsich
September 29 – John McLaren

October
October 1 – Ken Pape
October 2 – Bob Coluccio
October 3 – Dave Winfield
October 4 – Horace Speed
October 9 – Derek Bryant
October 13 – Frank LaCorte
October 15 – Mitchell Page
October 15 – Tommy Toms
October 18 – Andy Hassler
October 18 – Rudy Hernández
October 21 – Ron Pruitt
October 25 – Al Cowens
October 25 – John LaRose
October 26 – Steve Ontiveros
October 30 – Tom Poquette
October 31 – Dave Freisleben
October 31 – Dave Trembley

November
November 1 – Eric Raich
November 1 – Chico Ruiz
November 3 – Dwight Evans
November 7 – John Tamargo
November 10 – Mike Vail
November 13 – Larry Harlow
November 15 – Orlando González
November 16 – Herb Washington
November 20 – Jackson Todd
November 23 – Wayne Cage
November 25 – Bucky Dent
November 27 – Dan Spillner
November 29 – Gary Wheelock

December
December 2 – Adrian Devine
December 3 – Lafayette Currence
December 7 – Paul Dade
December 12 – Tim McClelland
December 15 – Jimmy Sexton
December 16 – Mike Flanagan
December 18 – Orlando Ramírez
December 20 – Mike Hart
December 24 – John D'Acquisto
December 25 – Luis Quintana
December 31 – Joe Simpson

Deaths

January
January   6 – Harry Camnitz, 66, pitcher who played with the Pittsburgh Pirates in the 1909 season and for the St. Louis Cardinals in 1911. 
January 10 – Tom Delahanty, 78, third baseman for the Philadelphia Phillies, Cleveland Spiders, Pittsburgh Pirates and Louisville Colonels of the National League in a span of three seasons between 1894 and 1897.
January 11 – Bill Wagner, 57, catcher who played from 1914 through 1918 for the Pittsburgh Pirates and Boston Braves.  	
January 13 – Charlie Miller,73, pinch hitter who appeared in just one game for the 1915 Baltimore Terrapins of the Federal League.
January 16 – Pid Purdy, 46, two-sport athlete who played outfield in four Major League seasons with the Chicago White Sox and Cincinnati Reds from 1927 to 1929, and was a quarterback in the National Football League for the Green Bay Packers in 1926 and 1927.
January 26 – Bill Barrett, 50, outfielder who played for the Philadelphia Athletics, Chicago White Sox, Boston Red Sox and Washington Senators over nine seasons between 1921 and 1930.

February
February   2 – Bill Sowders, 86, pitcher who played from 1888 through 1890 for the Boston Beaneaters and Pittsburgh Alleghenys clubs of the National League.
February   6 – Gabby Street, 68, who came into prominence as the personal catcher for the legendary pitcher Walter Johnson with the  Washington Senators, and as the first man to catch a baseball dropped from the top of Washington Monument; one of the few Major League managers to capture a World Series title in his first attempt, with the St. Louis Cardinals in 1930; managed Cardinals from 1930 to July 23, 1933, and St. Louis Browns for 146 games in 1938; late in his career, popular member of radio broadcast team for both St. Louis teams.
February   8 – Harry Ables, 67, pitcher who played for the St. Louis Browns, Cleveland Naps and New York Highlanders in part of three seasons spanning 1905–1911. 
February 14 – Harry Thompson, 61, pitcher who split his only big-league season between the Washington Senators and the Philadelphia Athletics in 1919.
February 20 – Marty Shay, 54, infielder who played with the Chicago Cubs in the 1916 season and for the Boston Braves in 1924.
February 25 – Smokey Joe Williams, 64, Hall of Fame pitcher and one of the most feared Negro league hurlers in the first half of the 20th century, who would shine for more than two decades for a number of teams, including the Chicago American Giants, New York Lincoln Giants and Homestead Grays, as well as for defeating Hall of Fame pitchers as Grover Alexander, Waite Hoyt, Walter Johnson and Rube Marquard in exhibition competition during his stellar career.

March
March   2 – Adam Comorosky, 45, left fielder for the Pittsburgh Pirates and the Cincinnati Reds in a ten-year career from 1926 to 1935, who in 1931 became the only outfielder in National League history to ever perform two unassisted double plays in a single season, joining American League outfielders Tris Speaker (twice), José Cardenal and Socks Seybold. 
March   3 – Dan Bickham, 86, pitcher who played in 1886 for the Cincinnati Red Stockings of the National League.
March 13 – Joe Hughes, 71, backup outfielder for the 1902 Chicago Orphans of the National League.
March 20 – Roscoe Coughlin, 83, pitcher who played from 1890 to 1891 for the Chicago Colts and New York Giants.
March 25 – Eddie Collins, 63, Hall of Fame second baseman who played from 1906 through 1930 for the  Philadelphia Athletics and Chicago White Sox; won the American League MVP Award in 1914, and is the only AL player to steal six bases in a single game, a feat he accomplished twice in September 1912; led the Athletics to four AL pennants and three World Series championships between 1910 and 1914, as well as the White Sox to the 1917 World Series title; ended his career with a .333 average, .424 on-base percentage, 3,314 hits, and 745 stolen bases in 2,826 games; managed White Sox from May 19 through June 18, 1924, and for all of 1925 and 1926, compiling a 174–160 record and a .521 winning percentage; after returning to the Athletics in 1927, became a coach from 1929–1932, serving on two more world champion clubs (1929, 1930); after 1932, moved to Boston Red Sox front office as general manager, working with owner Tom Yawkey to rebuild the club and winning 1946 AL pennant before retiring due to ill health after the 1947 season.
March 25 – Dan Daub, 83, pitcher who played in 1892 with the Cincinnati Reds and for the Brooklyn Grooms and Bridegrooms clubs from 1893 through 1897.	
March 28 – Kohly Miller, 77, backup infielder who played for the Washington Senators, St. Louis Browns and Philadelphia Phillies in a span of two seasons between 1892 and 1897.
March 28 – Joe Murphy, 84, pitcher who played from 1886 to 1887 for the Cincinnati Red Stockings, St. Louis Maroons and St. Louis Browns.

April
April   5 – Roy Moore, 52, pitcher who played from 1920 to 1923 with the Philadelphia Athletics and Detroit Tigers.
April   8 – Whitey Guese, 79, pitcher for the 1901 Cincinnati Reds.
April 13 – Wish Egan, 69, pitcher for the Detroit Tigers and St. Louis Cardinals in part of three seasons from 1902–1906, who later became a successful scout in the Tigers system over 40 years, whose discoveries included future Hall of Famers Hal Newhouser and Jim Bunning, and All-Stars like  Dizzy Trout,  Roy Cullenbine, Hoot Evers, Dick Wakefield, Johnny Lipon, Stubby Overmire, Art Houtteman and Barney McCosky, among others.
April 14 – Danny Moeller, 66, outfielder for the Pittsburgh Pirates, Washington Senators and Cleveland Indians during seven seasons between 1907 and 1916, who is listed as the first big leaguer of the dead-ball era (before 1950) to have at least five home runs and 100-plus strikeouts in consecutive seasons (1912–1913).
April 20 – Roy Brashear, 77, backup infielder for the St. Louis Cardinals and Philadelphia Phillies in part of two seasons from 1902–1903, who later umpired in the Pacific Coast League for several years.
April 22 – Ox Eckhardt, 49, right fielder who played with the Boston Braves in the 1932 season and for the Brooklyn Dodgers in 1936.
April 27 – Bill Eagle, 73, outfielder who played in 1898 for the Washington Senators of the National League.

May
May   4 – Charlie Buelow, 74, third baseman for the New York Giants in its 1901 season.
May   7 – Ezra Lincoln, 82, who pitched for the Cleveland Spiders and Syracuse Stars during the 1890 season.
May 20 – Frank Olin, 91, outfielder for the Washington Nationals and Toledo Blue Stockings of the American Association in 1884, and the Detroit Wolverines of the National League in 1885, who after graduating from Cornell University founded the  Olin Corporation in 1892, formed the Western Cartridge Company in 1898, and acquired the Winchester Repeating Arms Company in 1931, besides being a remarkable philanthropist.
May 26 – George Winter, 73, pitcher who won 82 games for the Boston Americans and Red Sox from 1901 to 1908, as well as the only member both of the original 1901 and 1908 Boston clubs.

June
June 11 – Tom Leahy, 82, backup catcher who played with five different teams in a span of five seasons from 1897–1905, mostly for the Washington Senators of the National League between 1897 and 1898.
June 17 – Bill Harper, 62, pitcher who appeared in two games for the St. Louis Browns of the American League in its 1911 season.
June 19 – Wally Gerber, 59, a slick shortstop with good hands and a strong throwing arm, who played for the Pittsburgh Pirates, St. Louis Browns and Boston Red Sox over 15 seasons between 1914 and 1929, while setting a Major League record for shortstops with 48 fielding chances in four consecutive games during the 1923 season, and leading the American League in double plays in 1920 and from 1926 to 1927.

July
July   3 – Hugh Casey, 37, relief pitching ace for the Brooklyn Dodgers in the 1940s, whose best season came in 1947 when he won 10 games and led the National League with 18 saves, establishing later a World Series record while facing the New York Yankees in six of the seven games of the Series, five consecutively, being credited with a 2–0 record, one save and only one run in  innings of work.
July   6 – Ted Easterly, 66, catcher for the Cleveland Naps, Chicago White Sox and Kansas City Packers in a span of six seasons from 1909 to 1915, who posted a batting average over .300 over three consecutive seasons with a career-high .324 in 1911, ranking twice among the top ten hitters in the American League and once in the Federal League. 
July   9 – Harry Heilmann, 56, Hall of Fame outfielder and Detroit Tigers star, who won four batting titles in the American League between 1921 and 1927, compiling averages of .394, .403, .393 and .398, whose career .342 batting average ranks him 12th in the all-time list; later, a sportscaster and radio play-by-play announcer for the Tigers from 1934 until his death.
July   9 – Huck Wallace, 68, pitcher for the 1912 Philadelphia Phillies.
July 10 – Bobby Messenger, 67, outfielder who played with the Chicago White Sox and St. Louis Browns in part of four seasons between 1909 and 1914.
July 14 – Dee Cousineau, 52, catcher who played in five total games for the Boston Braves in three seasons from 1923 to 1925.
July 14 – Vance Page, 45, pitcher who spent four seasons with the Chicago Cubs from 1938 through 1941. 
July 18 – Joe Klugmann, 56, second baseman who played for the Chicago Cubs, Brooklyn Robins and Cleveland Indians in part of four seasons between 1921 and 1925.	
July 19 – Sam Agnew, 64, solid catcher for the St. Louis Browns, Boston Red Sox and Washington Senators in span of seven seasons from 1913–1918, who was also a member of the 1918 World Series Champion Red Sox.
July 24 – Ed Fisher, 74, pitcher who appeared in one game for the Detroit Tigers near the end of the 1902 season.

August
August   1 – Harry Curtis, 68, catcher for the 1907 New York Giants.
August   2 – Guy Cooper, 68, pitcher who played from 1914 to 1915 for the New York Yankees and Boston Red Sox.
August   4 – Tony Tonneman, 69, catcher who played briefly for the 1911 Boston Red Sox.
August   7 – Bill Wynne, 82, who pitched in 1894 with the Washington Senators of the National League.
August   7 – Biff Wysong, 46, pitcher who played from 1930 through 1932 for the Cincinnati Reds.
August 10 – Win Kellum, 75, Canadian pitcher for the Boston Americans, Cincinnati Reds and St. Louis Cardinals during three seasons 1901 and 1905, who in 1901 became the first Opening Day starting pitcher in Boston American League franchise's history.
August 12 – Paul McSweeney, 84, backup infielder who appeared in three games for the 1891 St. Louis Browns of the National League.
August 17 – Doc Crandall, 63, pitcher who played with six teams in three different leagues between 1908 and 1918, most prominently for the New York Giants from 1908 to 1913, playing for them in three consecutive World Series from 1911–1913 and known also for his hitting, as he was often used as a pinch-hitter by Giants manager John McGraw.
August 17 – Ren Wylie, 89, center fielder who appeared in just one game for the 1882 Pittsburgh Alleghenys.
August 19 – Ollie Hanson, 55, pitcher who played for the Chicago Cubs in its 1921 season.
August 28 – Billy Lush, 77, very solid center fielder who spent seven seasons in the majors with four teams from 1895–1904, enjoying his most productive seasons in 1903 and 1904 with the Detroit Tigers and Cleveland Naps, respectively. 
August 28 – Bill Piercy, 55, pitcher who played for the New York Yankees, Boston Red Sox and Chicago Cubs during six seasons between 1917 and 1926, including the Yankees team that won the 1921 American League pennant.

September
September   4 – Carl Doyle, 39, pitcher who spent four seasons between 1935 and 1940 with the Philadelphia Athletics, Brooklyn Dodgers and St. Louis Cardinals.
September   5 – Jim Keesey, 48, first baseman who played with the Philadelphia Athletics in part of two seasons spanning 1925–1930.
September   9 – Chappie Snodgrass, 81, backup outfielder for the 1901 Baltimore Orioles.
September 10 – Hank DeBerry, 56, catcher who played for the Cleveland Indians and Brooklyn Robins in a span of eleven seasons from 1916–1930.
September 12 – Lave Winham, 69, who pitched from 1902 to 1903 for the Brooklyn Superbas and Pittsburgh Pirates.
September 14 – Wally Roettger, 49, outfielder for the St. Louis Cardinals, Cincinnati Reds, New York Giants and Pittsburgh Pirates from 1927 through 1935, who got the first hit and scored the first run in Game 1 of the 1931 World Series for the eventual champion Cardinals; head baseball coach of the University of Illinois from 1935 until his death.
September 16 – Bill Klem, 77, Hall of Fame umpire known as the Old Arbitrator and the Father of Baseball Umpires, who officiated National League games during a 37-year career from 1905 to 1941 and introduced the inside chest protector, while working in 18 World Series to set a Major League Baseball record for umpires.
September 23 – Dale Gear, 79, who pitched with the Cleveland Spiders in the 1896 season and for the Washington Senators in 1901.
September 25 – Nolen Richardson, 48, third baseman for the Detroit Tigers, New York Yankees and Cincinnati Reds during six seasons between 1929 and 1939, who also was the shortstop and captain of the 1937 Newark Bears, which is widely regarded as the best in Minor League Baseball history.

October
October 11 – Bob Becker, 76, pitcher for the Philadelphia Phillies in the 1897 and 1898 seasons.
October 12 – Bill Essick, 70, pitcher for the Cincinnati Reds from 1906 to 1907 and later a longtime Minor League manager and New York Yankees scout, who is credited for discovering or signing future Yankees stars Joe DiMaggio, Lefty Gomez, Joe Gordon and Ralph Houk, among others.
October 12 – Pug Griffin, 55, utility outfielder for the Philadelphia Athletics in 1917 and the New York Giants in 1920, who later became a successful manager in the Minor Leagues, guiding the Lincoln Links to the 1943 Nebraska State League title, and the Pueblo Rollers to the Western League championship in 1941.
October 12 – Rube Vinson, 72, outfielder who played from 1904 through 1906 for the Cleveland Naps and Chicago White Sox.
October 14 – Henry Zeiher, 89, catcher for the 1886 Washington Nationals of the National League.
October 17 – Al Clancy, 63, third baseman who appeared in three games for the St. Louis Browns in its 1911 season.
October 19 – Emil Haberer, 73,  catcher and corner infielder who played for the Cincinnati Reds in a span of three seasons from 1901–1909.
October 27 – Pryor McElveen, 69, third baseman who played for the Brooklyn Superbas and Dodgers teams between 1909 and 1911.
October 27 – John Brock, 55, backup catcher for the St. Louis Cardinals in the 1917 and 1918 seasons.
October 30 – Walt Woods, 76, valuable utility man who  played all positions except catcher and first base, whose career included stints with the Chicago Orphans, Louisville Colonels and Pittsburgh Pirates during three seasons from 1898 to 1900.

November
November   1 – Mickey Doolin, 71, slick fielding shortstop who played for the Philadelphia Phillies, Chicago Whales, Chicago Cubs, New York Giants and Brooklyn Robins in a span of 13 seasons between 1905 and 1918, while leading the National League in putouts four times, assists five times, double plays five times, and fielding percentage once.
November   3 – Joe Hovlik, 67, Hungarian pitcher who played from 1909 to 1911 for the Chicago White Sox and Washington Senators. 
November   5 – George Stovall, 73, who played and managed from 1904 through 1913 for the Cleveland Naps and St. Louis Browns of the American League, and for the Kansas City Packers of the outlaw Federal League in 1914 and 1915.
November   6 – Carl Husta, 49, shortstop who appeared in six games with the 1925 Philadelphia Athletics.
November   8 – Claude Ritchey, 78, middle infielder and outfielder over 13 seasons for the Cincinnati Reds, Pittsburgh Pirates, Boston Doves and Louisville Colonels, who helped the Pirates win three consecutive National League pennants from 1901 to 1903.
November 11 – Jim Neher, 62, pitcher who appeared in just one game for the Cleveland Naps in their 1912 season.
November 18 – Wally Mayer, 61,  catcher who played from 1911 through 1919 for the Chicago White Sox, Boston Red Sox and St. Louis Browns.
November 19 – Marty Griffin, 50, pitcher for the 1928 Boston Red Sox.
November 19 – Crese Heismann, 71,  pitcher who played from 1901 to 1902 with the Cincinnati Reds and Baltimore Orioles.
November 19 – Pete Hill, 69, Hall of Fame outfielder whose career from 1889 to the mid-1920s involved some of the pioneer programs of the Negro leagues, being considered to be a great center fielder with a strong arm and excellent glove, while his talents also extended as a consistent line-drive hitter,  both for average and power, with outstanding speed on the base paths, closing his career by serving as the player-manager for several teams between 1914 and 1925.
November 20 – Fred Burchell, 72, who pitched with the Philadelphia Phillies during the 1903 season and for the Boston Americans and Red Sox from 1907 to 1909.
November 20 – Joe Rogalski, 39, pitcher who played in 1938 with the Detroit Tigers.

December
December   5 – Jim Duggan, 66, first baseman who played for the St. Louis Browns in its 1911 season.
December   5 – Shoeless Joe Jackson, 63, left fielder and prominent hitter whose career lasted from 1908 to 1920 with the Philadelphia Athletics, Cleveland Naps and Chicago White Sox, who hit .408 in 1908, the highest batting average ever by a rookie, while hitting a slash line of .408/.468/.590 in 1911 during his first season as a full-time player, and leading the White Sox to the 1917 World Series victory against the New York Giants, ending his career with a .356 average for the third highest in Major League history, before being banished from the sport for his involvement in the Black Sox scandal.
December   8 – Bobby Lowe, 86, second baseman who joined the Boston Beaneaters in 1890 and remained with them through 1901, winning five National League pennants in that period while completing an outstanding infield that featured Fred Tenney at first, Herman Long at shortstop and Jimmy Collins at third, whose claim to fame came when he became the first player in Major League history to hit four home runs in a single game, which was played on the afternoon of Memorial Day, 1894, against the Cincinnati Reds at Congress Street Grounds.
December 18 – Spencer Abbott, 74, coach for 1935 Washington Senators and longtime minor league player and manager, whose baseball career lasted for 52 years.
December 18 – Joe Ohl, 63, pitcher for the 1909 Senators.
December 19 – Bob Lindemann, 70, backup outfielder who played for the Philadelphia Athletics in 1901.
December 27 – Ernie Lindemann, 73, pitcher who appeared in one game for the Boston Doves in 1907. 
December 29 – Hiram Bithorn, 35, pitcher who was the first player born in Puerto Rico to play in the Major Leagues when he made his debut with the Chicago Cubs in its 1942 season, leading the National League pitchers with seven shutouts in 1943, while posting a record of 34–31 and 3.16 ERA in 105 games over four seasons.
December 30 – Bob Kinsella, 52, outfielder who spent two seasons with the New York Giants from 1919 to 1920.

Sources

External links

Baseball Reference – 1951 MLB Season Summary
Baseball Reference – MLB Players born in 1951
Baseball Reference – MLB Players died in 1951